Crassostrea is a genus of true oysters (family Ostreidae) containing some of the most important oysters used for food. Some species in the genus have been moved to the genus Magallana.

Species

Extant species 
Extant species include:
 Crassostrea aequatorialis (d'Orbigny 1846)
 Crassostrea angulata (Lamarck 1819) – Portuguese oyster
 Crassostrea brasiliana (Lamarck 1819)
 Crassostrea chilensis (Philippi 1845)
 Crassostrea columbiensis (Hanley 1846)
 Crassostrea corteziensis (Hertlein 1951)
 Crassostrea cuttackensis (Newton & Smith, 1912)
 Crassostrea dianbaiensis (Xia, Wu, Xiao & Yu, 2014)
 Crassostrea rhizophorae (Guilding 1828)
 Crassostrea sikamea (Amemiya 1928) – Kumamoto oyster
 Crassostrea tulipa (Lamarck 1819) – mangrove oyster
 Crassostrea virginica (Gmelin 1791) – eastern oyster

Fossil species 

Fossil species include:
 †Crassostrea alabamiensis (Lea 1833)
 †Crassostrea ashleyi (Hertlein 1943) (syn. Ostrea arnoldi)
 †Crassostrea cahobasensis (Pilsbry and Brown 1910)
 †Crassostrea contracta (Conrad 1865)
 †Crassostrea cucullaris (Lamarck 1819)
 †Crassostrea cuebana (Jung 1974)
 †Crassostrea elegans (Deshayes, 1832) (syn. †Cubitostrea elegans Deshayes 1832 or Crassostrea (Cubitostrea) elegans)
 †Crassostrea gigantissima (Finch 1824) – Giant fossil oyster
 †Crassostrea gryphoides (Schlotheim 1813)
 †Crassostrea hatcheri (Ihering 1899)
 †Crassostrea ingens (Zittel 1864)
 †Crassostrea kawauchidensis (Tamura 1977)
 †Crassostrea patagonica (d'Orbigny 1842) (syn. Ostrea ferrarisi)
 †Crassostrea raincourti (Deshayes 1858)
 †Crassostrea titan (Conrad 1853) (syn. Ostrea prior, O. andersoni)
 †Crassostrea transitoria (Hupé 1854) (syn. Ostrea maxima)
 †Crassostrea wyomingensis

Genetics 
The genome of Crassostrea gigas (now Magallana gigas) has been recently sequenced revealing an extensive set of genes that enable it to cope with environmental stresses.

References 
Crassostrea on britannica.com.

 
Bivalve genera

Extant Early Cretaceous first appearances